West Limerick was a UK Parliament constituency in Ireland, returning one Member of Parliament from 1885 to 1922.

Prior to the 1885 United Kingdom general election the area was part of the Limerick County constituency. Representation at Westminster in this constituency ceased at the 1922 United Kingdom general election, which took place on 15 November, shortly before the establishment of the Irish Free State on 6 December 1922.

Boundaries
This constituency comprised the western part of County Limerick.

1885–1922: The baronies of Connello Lower, Connello Upper, Glenquin, Kenry and Shanid, and that part of the barony of Coshma contained within the parishes of Adare, Drehidtarsna and Killonohan.

Members of Parliament

Notes:-
 1 Not an election, but the date of a party change. The Irish Parliamentary Party had been created in 1882, on the initiative of Charles Stewart Parnell's Irish National League. Both the IPP and the INL split into Parnellite and Anti-Parnellite factions, in December 1890. The Parnellites remained members of the Irish National League after the split and the Anti-Parnellites organised the Irish National Federation in March 1891. The two organisations and the United Irish League merged in 1900, to re-create the Irish Parliamentary Party.
 2 Date of polling day. The result was declared on 28 December 1918, to allow time for votes cast by members of the armed forces to be included in the count.

Elections

Elections in the 1880s

Elections in the 1890s

Elections in the 1900s

Elections in the 1910s

References

Historic constituencies in County Limerick
Westminster constituencies in County Limerick (historic)
Dáil constituencies in the Republic of Ireland (historic)
Constituencies of the Parliament of the United Kingdom established in 1885
Constituencies of the Parliament of the United Kingdom disestablished in 1922